Jacek Marek Bierkowski (born 17 April 1948) is a Polish fencer. He competed in the individual and team sabre events at the 1976 and 1980 Summer Olympics.

References

1948 births
Living people
Polish male fencers
Olympic fencers of Poland
Fencers at the 1976 Summer Olympics
Fencers at the 1980 Summer Olympics
Sportspeople from Ruda Śląska
20th-century Polish people